T&F may refer to:

 Track and field, a collection of sporting events which include running, throwing and jumping.
 Track & Field (video game), a 1980s video game by Konami based on the above sport
 Taylor and Francis, an international company which publishes books and academic journals
Thomas & Friends (titled Thomas the Tank Engine & Friends prior to 2003), a British television series based on The Railway Series of books by the Reverend Wilbert Awdry and his son, Christopher Awdry.